Wooden Hill is a private estate within the council ward of Great Hollands, Bracknell, in Berkshire, England.

The hill holds Wooden Hill Primary School in one of its 7 roads, and also has a portion of Great Hollands Recreation Ground visible nearer to the top of the hill. All roads in Wooden Hill begin with 'S'

Bracknell